Hans Jacob Hansen (10 August 1855 – 26 June 1936) was a Danish zoologist, known for his contributions to carcinology (the study of crustacea). He was born in Bellinge and died in Gentofte.
He participated on the first year of the Ingolf expedition to Iceland and Greenland in 1895.

References

Biographical Etymology of Marine Organism Names – H.

Literature

1855 births
1936 deaths
Danish zoologists
Danish carcinologists